Lepidolopsis is a genus of flowering plants in the daisy family.

About a dozen species names have been published within the genus, but only one is widely accepted: Lepidolopsis turkestanica. It is native to Tajikistan, Kyrgyzstan, Uzbekistan, Kazakhstan, Afghanistan, and Iran.

References

Anthemideae
Monotypic Asteraceae genera
Flora of Asia